Smithfield Presbyterian Church may refer to:
 
 Smithfield Presbyterian Church (Amenia, New York), listed on the NRHP
 Smithfield Presbyterian Church (Peterboro, New York), listed on the NRHP